William Joseph Beldue (September 9, 1889 – September 28, 1955) was the American inventor of the eyelash curler.

Invention
Beldue invented the eyelash curler while working at the Kurlash Company at 77 South Avenue in Rochester, New York. He and his colleague, William R. Tuttle, co-held several patents with the company. Patents issued at least in part to Beldue include:
Great Britain No. 581,055, Improvements in eyelash curlers, August 11, 1944
U.S. No. 2,391,047, Eyelash curler, December 18, 1945
U.S. No. 2,460,317, Eyelash curler, February 1, 1949
Canada No. 456189, EYELASH CURLER, April 26, 1949
U.S. No. 2,474,873, Eyelash curler, July 5, 1949
Great Britain No. 689,019, Improvements in eyelash curlers, December 18, 1951
U.S. No. 2,602,458, Eyelash curler, July 18, 1952
Canada No. 493071, EYELASH CURLERS, May 26, 1953
Canada No. 493219, EYELASH CURLER, May 26, 1953

Personal life
Beldue had three sons, William Jr., Harold W., and Donald, and a daughter, Kathern. born November 17, 1929.

Death
William Beldue died in Rochester, New York and is buried in Riverside Cemetery.

References

External links

The Kurlash Company

People from Rochester, New York
1889 births
1955 deaths
20th-century American inventors